Sardar Ahmed Ali Khan Pitafi (30 May 1942 – 5 January 2018) was a Pakistani politician and a member of Pakistan Peoples Party. He served as a member of Provincial Assembly of Sindh between 1988 and 1990, 1993–96, 2008–13 and 2013–18.

He completed his graduation from University of Sindh.

On 5 January 2018, he died at the Ziadin Postgraduate Medical Centre in Karachi, aged 74.

References

1942 births
2018 deaths
Sindh MPAs 2013–2018
Pakistan People's Party politicians
University of Sindh alumni